Calverton is an unincorporated area and census-designated place located on the boundary between Montgomery and Prince George's counties, Maryland, in the United States. At the 2020 census, it had a population of 17,316.

Geography
As an unincorporated area, Calverton's boundaries are not officially defined. Calverton is, however, recognized by the United States Census Bureau as a census-designated place, and by the United States Geological Survey as a populated place located at  (39.057009, −76.944805) and is part of the Baltimore/Washington area. Calverton is located between Beltsville and Silver Spring, with Laurel, Hillandale and Adelphi being in close proximity. The Prince George's County side of Calverton (postal code 20705) is a neighborhood of Beltsville, while the Montgomery County side (postal code 20904) identifies with Silver Spring.
 

Demographics

2020 census

Note: the US Census treats Hispanic/Latino as an ethnic category. This table excludes Latinos from the racial categories and assigns them to a separate category. Hispanics/Latinos can be of any race.

2000 Census
At the 2000 census, there were 12,610 people, 4,543 households and 3,230 families residing in the area. The racial makeup of the area was 43.09% White, 34.06% African American, 0.14% Native American, 16.52% Asian, 0.01% Pacific Islander, 2.61% from other races, and 3.57% from two or more races. Hispanic or Latino of any race were 6.37% of the population.

There were 4,543 households, of which 35.7% had children under the age of 18 living with them, 54.4% were married couples living together, 13.0% had a female householder with no husband present, and 28.9% were non-families. 23.5% of all households were made up of individuals, and 4.0% had someone living alone who was 65 years of age or older. The average household size was 2.73 and the average family size was 3.24.

25.0% of the population were under the age of 18, 7.6% from 18 to 24, 33.0% from 25 to 44, 24.0% from 45 to 64, and 10.4% who were 65 years of age or older. The median age was 36 years. For every 100 females, there were 91.4 males. For every 100 females age 18 and over, there were 86.0 males.

The median household income was $63,990 and the median family income was $72,958. Males had a median income of $44,425 and females $39,563. The per capita income was $28,107. About 2.5% of families and 4.0% of the population were below the poverty line, including 2.7% of those under age 18 and 2.5% of those age 65 or over.

Government and infrastructure 

Prince George's County Police Department District 6 Station in Beltsville CDP serves the portion of Calverton in PG County.

The U.S. Postal Service operates the Colesville Carrier Annex in the Montgomery County side of Calverton CDP.

Education

Primary and secondary schools

Public schools 
Children living on the Montgomery County side of Calverton attend public schools in the Montgomery County Public Schools system. They generally attend:
 Galway Elementary School on Galway Drive in Calverton CDP.
 Briggs Chaney Middle School on Rainbow Drive in Cloverly CDP
 Paint Branch High School on Old Columbia Pike in Fairland CDP

Children living on the Prince George's County side of Calverton attend public schools in the Prince George's County Public Schools system. They generally attend:
 Calverton Elementary School on Beltsville Road in Calverton CDP
 Martin Luther King Middle School on Amendale Road in Beltsville CDP.
 High Point High School on Powder Mill Road in Beltsville CDP.

In popular culture
Calverton is mentioned in the movie Timecop.

References

Census-designated places in Maryland
Census-designated places in Montgomery County, Maryland
Census-designated places in Prince George's County, Maryland
Outer Silver Spring, Maryland